Hertz is a lunar impact crater that lies on the far side of the Moon, just behind the eastern limb. Due to libration this feature can sometimes be observed from the Earth under favorable lighting conditions. It is located to the west-southwest of the larger crater Fleming and north-northeast of the smaller Moiseev. Moiseev is joined to Hertz by the satellite crater Moiseev Z, and the three form a short crater chain.

This is a somewhat worn crater formation with a wide inner wall. There is a pear-shaped crater along the northern inner wall. The interior floor is relatively featureless, with only a small ridge offset to the southwest of the midpoint.

The crater was named after the German physicist Heinrich Rudolf Hertz in 1961. Prior to that, this crater was known as Crater 200.

References

External links

Hertz at The Moon Wiki

Impact craters on the Moon